Flowers TV is an Indian Malayalam language general entertainment pay television channel owned by Insight Media City. The channel was launched on 12 April 2015.

Establishment 
The channel was originally promoted by Sreekandan Nair who is also the managing director of Flowers TV. Gokulam Gopalan is the chairman and Dr. Vidhya Vinod is the vice Chairman of Flowers TV.

History 
Flowers TV is broadcasting from Kochi, Kerala, India  As per the statistical analysis of BARC data for the first eight weeks of 2017, Flowers is ranked in the top 5 lists.

Flowers TV is available in USA through YuppTV and also other Asian regions. Flowers once broadcast I-League matches with Malayalam Commentary.

On 12 April 2017, Flowers TV, Rays3D, Mulakuppadam Films and Mohanlal set a Guinness World Record for the largest attendance at a 3D film screening, 12,526 spectators watched the screening of the Malayalam film Pulimurugan at Adlux International Convention Centre in Angamaly, Kerala.

Channels

Current programming

Soap operas/Sitcom

Reality shows

Former broadcasts

Dubbed series

Original series

Drama series

Comedy series

Reality/Non-scripted programming 
Ammayum Kunjum (2020)
Ambada Njane (2016)
Anantharam (2019-2020)
Arogyamalayali (2018)
Bollywood Buzz (2015-2016)
Comedy Utsavam (2016-2020)
Comedy Super Show (2020)
Comedy Utsavam 2 (2020-2021)
Comedy Kondattam (2021)
Comedy Super Nite (2015–2016)
Comedy Super Nite 2 (2016–2017)
Comedy Super Nite 3 (2017–2018)
Double Fit (2020)
Fashion League (2015)
Fashion Studio (2015-2016)
Film Cafe (2015-2016)
Focus (2017-2018)
Katturumbu (2016-2018)
Jehans Kitchen (2018)
Kaathukuthan Katturumbu (2018)
Keraleeyam (2015)
Music League (2015)
Malabar Masala (2015)
Malayali Veettamma (2017)
Melam Marakkatha Swad (2017 -2019)
Mylanchy Monchu (2018-2019)
Midumidukki (2021)
Nakshathrakoodaram (2015–2016)
Neram Pokki (2015-2017)
Oru Nimisham (2016)
Pokkathil Pakru (2017)
Phoenix Kerala (2018)
Top Singer (2018-2020)
Smart Show (2015–2016)
Smart Show 60 (2016)
Sreekandan Nair Show (2015)
Star Challenge (2015)
Student Startup (2020-2021)
Star Magic (2019-2022)
Samrambhaka (2021-2022)
Tharapachakam (2016)
Tamaar Padaar (2017-2019)
Tasty Travels (2016–2017)
Utsavam Superstar (2019)
Varnagal (2018)
Super Dancer (2016-2017)(Dubbed)

Movies 
Manasa Vacha Karmana (1979)
Angadi (1980)
Ahimsa (1981)
Chiriyo Chiri (1982)
Kattathe Kilikkoodu (1983)
Ithiri Poove Chuvannapoove (1984)
Vartha (1986)
Jaathakam (1989)
Oru Vadakkan Veeragatha (1989)
Kadalorakkattu (1991)
Ennum Nanmakal (1991)
Dhalapathi (1991)
Adhwaytham (1992)
Ekalavyan (1993)
Chanakya Soothrangal (1994)
Dollar (1994)
Sudhinam (1994)
Thumboli Kadappuram (1995)
Kaanaakkinaavu (1996)
Thooval Kottaram (1996)
Harbour (1996)
Sulthan Hyderali (1996)
Minsara Kanavu (1997)
Asuravamsam (1997)
The Truth (1998)
Uyire (1998)
Ennu Swantham Janakikutty (1998)
Olympian Anthony Adam (1999)
Friends (1999)
Veendum Chila Veettukaryangal (1999)
Kochu Kochu Santhoshangal (2000)
Shantham (2000)
Gemini (2002)
Mitr, My Friend (2002)
Thirumalai (2003)
Achuvinte Amma (2005)
Thirupaachi (2005)
Yes Your Honour (2006)
Notebook (2006)
Kuselan (2008)
Njanum Ente Sreeyum (2011)
Crocodile Love Story (2013)
Chandra (2013)
Angels (2014)
Cousins (2014)
Asha Black (2014)
Naku Penta Naku Taka (2014)
Nee-Na (2015)
Mariyam Mukku (2015)
Thilothamaa (2015)
Aakashvani (2016)
School Bus (2016)
Hello Namasthe (2016)
Fukri (2017)
Aana Alaralodalaral (2017)
Clint (2017)
Lakshyam (2017)
Comrade In America (2017)
Njan Gagan (2017)
Kammara Sambhavam (2018)

Award functions 
Flowers television holds the broadcast rights to the following award nights:

 Flowers TV awards
 Flowers Music Awards
 Flowers Comedy Awards
 Flowers Indian Film Awards
 Kerala State Film Award
 Kerala Film Critics Association Awards
 Flowers Gulf Film Awards

References

External links
 
 

2015 establishments in Kerala
Malayalam-language television channels
Television stations in Kochi
Television channels and stations established in 2015
Lists of television shows